Louis G. Navellier is Chairman and Founder of Navellier & Associates in Reno, Nevada, which manages approximately $1.0 billion in assets.  Navellier also writes five investment newsletters focused on growth investing: Growth Investor, Breakthrough Stocks, Accelerated Profits, Power Options and Platinum Growth Club, and can frequently be seen giving his market outlook and analysis on Bloomberg, Fox News, and CNBC.muire

Early life and education 

Navellier was born in 1957, in Berkeley, California. He was one of the eight in his family to attend college, going to the School of Business & Economics at Cal State Hayward, now Cal State East Bay. He graduated in 1978 at the age of 20 with a B.S. in Finance, and then got his MBA in 1979.

Career 

While at Cal State, Navellier took part in a research project in which the goal was to mimic the S&P 500’s performance. During this project Navellier discovered some methods beating the market using quantitative and fundamental analysis.

Navellier is the founder, and currently the chairman, of Navellier & Associates, in Reno, Nevada. Navellier and his team of about 11 professional analysts and staff manage over $2.5 billion in private accounts and no-load mutual funds for individual investors and institutions.  Navellier manages thousands of personal portfolios, as well as the Navellier no-load mutual funds. TheStockAdvisors.com, an independent investment website, calls Navellier "the one advisor whose track record sits at the very top of the long-term performance ratings." Navellier currently travels the country hosting seminars for individual investors.

In 1980, Navellier began publishing MPT Review, a monthly newsletter for individual investors.  In 1997 he partnered with publisher InvestorPlace Media, LLC (formerly Phillips Investment Resources, LLC) to launch The Blue Chip Growth Letter, which applied the investment strategy used in MPT Review to strictly blue chip stocks.  In January 2005 Navellier and InvestorPlace Media re-launched MPT Review, renaming it Emerging Growth. The Hulbert Financial Digest rated the Emerging Growth newsletter as the number one performer in the 20-year category from 1985–2005, among 32 surviving newsletters.  Hulbert estimated that from 1985 through 2008, following the advice of that newsletter would have resulted in a gain of about 2,156% according to The Hulbert Financial Digest. During the same time period the S&P 500 index had an increase of about 869%.  He and InvestorPlace Media also publish the Quantum Growth and Global Growth newsletters.

Mr. Navellier employs a three-step, highly disciplined, bottom-up stock selection process, focusing on quantitative analysis, fundamental analysis, and optimization of the securities selected for the portfolio. In 1980, Mr. Navellier began publishing his research in his stock advisory newsletter, the MPT Review. Since 1987, he has been active in the management of individual portfolios, mutual funds, and institutional portfolios.

Louis Navellier has been covered by a wide range of international media. In addition to appearing on CNBC, Bloomberg, The Nightly Business Report, and Wall Street Week, he has been featured in Barron's, Forbes, Fortune, Investor's Business Daily, Money, Smart Money, and The Wall Street Journal. Most recently he was profiled in Kenneth A. Stern's book Secrets of the Investment All-Stars in the interview "Louis Navellier, A Man Who Has Beat Them All." He is also featured in Alan R. Ackerman's Investing Under Fire: Winner Strategies from the Masters for Bulls, Bears, and the Bewildered.

In October 2007, Navellier's book, The Little Book That Makes You Rich, was released. It is part of the John Wiley & Sons “Little Book, Big Profits” series. On Jan. 23, 2009, Louis Navellier launched an exchange-traded fund, the RevenueShares Navellier Overall A-100 Fund (ticker symbol RWV). This ETF searched a database of nearly 5,000 stocks for the best companies according to Navellier's top fundamental factors such as sales growth, earnings growth and cash flow. The ETF holdings were rebalanced quarterly. In honor of the new fund, Louis Navellier rang the opening bell on Wall Street for New York Stock Exchange on Friday, February 13, 2009. However, the new fund underperformed the stock market, and was liquidated in 2016.

In 2017, the SEC charged Navellier for fraud for falsifying the firm’s track record in marketing materials. He denies the charges.

In 2020, the U.S. Securities and Exchange Commission (SEC) announced final judgment on its fraud charges against investment adviser Navellier & Associates, Inc. and its founder and chief investment officer, Louis Navellier. Following the ruling of a federal district court in Massachusetts that found the plaintiffs guilty of "breach[ing] their fiduciary duties and defraud[ing] their advisory clients and prospective clients", Navellier & Associates, Inc and Louis Navellier himself were ordered to pay fines of over $30 million to the SEC.

"The court determined, the defendants continued to sell the Vireo AlphaSector investment strategies despite their knowledge that representations about the strategies were false and misleading... In addition to enjoining the defendants from violating Sections 206(1) and 206(2) of the Advisers Act, the final judgment entered on June 2, 2020 also orders defendants jointly and severally to pay disgorgement of $28,964,571, including $6,513,619 in prejudgment interest, as well as civil penalties against Navellier & Associates in the amount of $2,000,000 and against Mr. Navellier in the amount of $500,000."

Personal 
Navellier and his wife and three children split their time between their residences in Florida and Nevada. He is a collector of high performance automobiles.

Navellier began serving as a trustee of the Cal State East Bay Education Foundation in December 2007. He has also pledged to give Cal State $500,000.

References

External links 

 Official website
 Company profile
 Portfolio Grader
 The Little Book That Makes You Rich
  Louis Navellier's Market 360

American businesspeople
Living people
California State University, East Bay alumni
Financial advisors
Year of birth missing (living people)